Folk-Tales of Bengal is a collection of folk tales and fairy tales of Bengal written by Lal Behari Dey. The book was published in 1883. The illustrations by Warwick Goble were added in 1912. All these stories were passed from generation to generation for centuries.

Stories

This list represents the 1912 Contents (page xi) that is displayed in small caps.
 Life's Secret
 Phakir Chand
 The Indigent Brahman
 The Story of the Rakshasas
 The Story of Swet-Basanta
 The Evil Eye of Sani
 The Boy whom Seven Mothers suckled
 The Story of Prince Sobur
 The Origin of Opium
 Strike but Hear
 The Adventures of Two Thieves and of their Sons
 The Ghost-Brahman
 The Man who wished to be Perfect
 A Ghostly Wife
 The Story of a Brahmadaitya
 The Story of a Hiraman
 The Origin of Rubies
 The Match-making Jackal
 The Boy with the Moon on his Forehead
 The Ghost who was Afraid of being Bagged
 The Field of Bones
 The Bald Wife

References

External links

 Folk-Tales of Bengal (1912 illustrated ed.) as Project Gutenberg #38488

Indian fairy tales
Collections of fairy tales
Bengali-language literature
Indian folklore
Indian literature